Raymond is a male given name. It was borrowed into English from French (older French spellings were Reimund and Raimund, whereas the modern English and French spellings are identical). It originated as the Germanic ᚱᚨᚷᛁᚾᛗᚢᚾᛞ (Raginmund) or ᚱᛖᚷᛁᚾᛗᚢᚾᛞ (Reginmund).  Ragin (Gothic) and regin (Old German) meant "counsel".  The Old High German mund originally meant "hand", but came to mean "protection". This etymology suggests that the name originated in the Early Middle Ages, possibly from Latin. Alternatively, the name can also be derived from Germanic Hraidmund, the first element being Hraid, possibly meaning "fame" (compare Hrod, found in names such as Robert, Roderick, Rudolph, Roland, Rodney and Roger) and mund meaning "protector". 

Despite the German and French origins of the English name, some of its early uses in English documents appear in Latinized form.  As a surname, its first recorded appearance in Britain appeared in 1086, during the reign of William the Conqueror, in the Domesday Book, with a reference to Giraldus Reimundus.

The most commonly used names for baby boys based on "Ragin" in 2009 were, in descending order, Raymond, Ramiro, Rayner, Rein, Reingard, Reynard, and Reynold. Its many other variants include Raiment, Raimo, Raimond, Raimondi, Raimondo, Raimund, Raimundo, Ramon, Ramón, Ramond, Ramondelli, Ramondenc, Ramondi, Ramondini, Ramondino, Ramondo, Ramondou, Ramonenc, Ramonic, Ramundi, Rayment, Raymonenc, Raymonencq, Raymont, Raymund, Redmond, Redmonds, Reim, Reimund, Reinmund, Rémon, Rémond, Remondeau, Remondon, Rémont, Reymond, Rimondi, and Rimondini.

Translations and variations 
 Albanian: Rajmond
 Ancient Germanic: Raginmund, Raimund
 Arabic: ريمون (Rimun)
 Basque: Erramun, Erramon
 Belarusian: Райманд (Rajmand)
 Bengali: রেমন্ড (Rēmanḍa)
 Bulgarian: Реймонд (Rejmond)
 Catalan: Ramon, Raimon
 Chinese Simplified: 雷蒙德
 Chinese Traditional:  雷蒙德
 Croatian: Rajmund
 Czech: Rajmund
Danish: Ramund
 Dutch: Remon, Ramone, Raemon, Raemonn, Ramond, Ramonte, Remone
 English: Raymund, Ray, Raymon, Rayman, Raymann, Raymen, Raymone, Raymun, Raemonn, Redmond, Radmond, Radmund, Reddin, Redmund, Reimond, Reymon, Reymound, Reymund, Raimond, Raimonds
 Estonian: Raimund, Raimond
 Finnish: Raimo, Reima
 French: Raymond, Raymonde (feminine), Reimonde
 German: Raimund, Reimund
 Greek: Ραϋμόνδος (Raf̱̈móndos, Raÿmóndos), also Ρεμούνδος (Remoúndos)
 Gujarati: રેમન્ડ (Rēmanḍa)
 Hebrew: ריימונד
 Hindi: रेमंड (Rēmaṇḍa)
 Hungarian: Ramón, Rajmund
 Indonesian: Raimundus
 Irish: Réamann, Radmond, Redmond, Redmund, Reamonn, Ré
 Italian: Raimondo, Raimondi, Raymondo, Reimondo, Reimundo
 Japanese: レイモンド (Reimondo), レーモンド (Rēmondo)
 Kannada: ರೇಮಂಡ್ (Rēmaṇḍ)
 Marathi: रेमंड (Rēmaṇḍ)
 Korean: 레이몬드 (Reimondeu)
 Latin: Raimundus
 Latvian: Raimonds
 Limburgish: Remao, Mao
 Lithuanian: Raimundas, Raimondas
 Macedonian: Рејмонд (Rejmond)
 Nepali: रेमंड (Rēmaṇḍa)
Norwegian: Rådmund, Råmund
Old Norse: Ráðmundr, Rámundr
 Persian: ریموند
 Polish: Rajmund
 Portuguese: Raimundo
 Punjabi: ਰੇਮੰਡ (Rēmaḍa)
 Romanian: Reimond
 Russian: Раймонд (Raymond)
 Scots: Raymond, Raymie, Ray
 Scottish Gaelic: Reamonn
 Serbian: Рејмонд (Rejmond)
 Slovene: Rajmund
 Spanish: Raimundo, Ramón, Ramon, Remon, Remone, Romone, Raymundo, Raemondo, Raimondo, Raimundo, Raimon, Raymondo, Reymundo, Reimundo, Mundo
Swedish: Ramunder
Tagalog: Ramón, Raymundo
 Tamil: ரேமண்ட் (Rēmaṇṭ)
 Telugu: రేమండ్ (Rēmaṇḍ)
 Thai: เรย์มอนด์ (Rey̒ mxn d̒)
 Ukrainian: Раймонд (Raymond)
 Urdu: ریمنڈ
 Welsh: Raimwnt
 Yiddish: רייַמאָנד (Ryyamʼánd)
 Yoruba: Remondi

Given name

Pre-modern era

Aristocracy
Raymond I, Count of Toulouse (died 865)
Raymond II, Count of Toulouse (died 924)
Raymond III, Count of Toulouse (died 978)
Raymond IV, Count of Toulouse (c. 1041 or 1042–1105), Count of Tripoli from 1102 to 1105
Raymond V, Count of Toulouse (1134–1198)
Raymond VI, Count of Toulouse (1156–1222)
Raymond VII, Count of Toulouse (1197–1249)
Raymond II, Count of Tripoli (c. 1115–1152), Count of Tripoli from 1137 to 1152
Raymond III, Count of Tripoli (c. 1142–1187), Count of Tripoli from 1152 to 1187
Raymond-Roupen (died 1219), Prince of Antioch
Raymond of Poitiers (c. 1115–1149), Prince of Antioch
Raymond Roger Trencavel (1185–1209)
Raymond of Burgundy (1070–1107), married to Queen Urraca of Castile
Raymond of Antioch (c. 1195–1213), eldest son of Bohemond IV of Antioch

Saints
Raymond of Penyafort (c. 1175–1275), medieval canon lawyer
Raymond Nonnatus (1204–1240), ransomer of hostages
Raymond of Fitero (d. 1163), founder of the military order of the Knights of Calatrava

Chronicler
Raymond of Aguilers (1096–1099), chronicler of the First Crusade

Modern world

Artists and entertainers
 Raymond Antrobus (born 1986), British poet
 Raymond Bailey (1904–1980), American actor
 Ray Bolger (1904–1987), American entertainer of stage and screen
 Ray Bradbury (1920–2012), American science fiction and fantasy author
 Raymond Briggs (1934–2022), English illustrator, cartoonist, graphic novelist, and author
 Raymond Burr (1917–1993), Canadian actor
 Raymond Carver (1938–1988), American short story writer and poet
 Raymond Chandler (1888–1959), American novelist and screenwriter
 Raymond Chow (1927–2018), Hong Kong film producer
 Raymond E. Feist (born 1945), American fantasy writer
 Ray Gillen (1959–1993), American rock singer-songwriter
 Raymond Gutierrez, Filipino host
 Ray Harryhausen (1920–2013), American-British animator and special effects creator
 Raymond Kaskey (born 1943), American sculptor
 Raymond van de Klundert, also known as Ray Kluun (born 1964), Dutch novelist
 Raymond Lam (born 1979), Hong Kong singer and actor
 Raymond Massey (1896–1983), Canadian actor
 Raymond Pettibon (born 1957), American artist
 Raymond Queneau (1903–1976), French poet and novelist
 Raymond Scott (1908–1994), American composer, band leader, pianist, engineer, record producer, and inventor
 Raymond Smullyan (1919–2017), American mathematician, concert pianist, logician, Taoist philosopher, and magician
 Raymond Sudre (1870–1962), French sculptor
 Raymond Joseph Teller (born 1948), one-half of the duo Penn & Teller
 Raymond Templier (1891–1968), French jewellery designer
 Raymond Wong Pak-ming (born 1948), Hong Kong actor and film producer
 Raymond Wong Ho-yin (born 1975), Hong Kong actor

Politicians and activists
 Raymond Eddé (1913–2000), Lebanese politician
 Raymond L. Finch (born 1940), judge of the District Court of the Virgin Islands
 Raymond Ho (born 1939), member of the Legislative Council of Hong Kong
 Raymond Mhlaba (1920–2005), South African anti-apartheid activist
 Raymond Poincaré (1860–1934), President of France and leader of France during World War I

Religious figures
 Raymond Leo Burke (born 1948), American Roman Catholic prelate
 Raymond Lahey (born 1940), Canadian disgraced former Roman Catholic bishop
 Raymond Pichard, French priest and television presenter

Scientists
 Raymond Cattell (1905–1998), British-American psychologist
 Raymond Davis Jr. (1914–2006), chemist and Nobel Prize winner in physics
 Raymond Gesteland, American geneticist
 Raymond Herb (1908–1996), American nuclear physicist

Sportspeople
 Raymond van Barneveld (born 1967), Dutch darts player
 Raymond Berry (born 1933), American football player
 Raymond Calais (born 1998), American football player
 Raymond Daniels (martial artist) (born 1980), American martial artist
 Raymond Domenech (born 1952), French football manager
 Raymond Hunter (1938–2020), Irish cricketer and rugby union player
 Raymond Kopa (1931-2017), French football player
 Raymond Townsend (born 1955), American basketball player

Other
 Raymond Bessone (1911–1992), British hairdresser known as "Mr Teasy-Weasy"
 Raymond Blanc (born 1949), French chef
 Raymond Chien (born 1952), president of MTR and chairman of Hang Seng Bank in Hong Kong
 Ray Honeyford (1934–2012), English headmaster and writer
 Raymond Kelly (born 1941), Commissioner of the New York Police Department
 Ray Kurzweil (born 1948), American author, inventor, and futurist
 Raymond Lisle (1910–1994), American attorney, officer in the US Foreign Service, and Dean of Brooklyn Law School
 Raymond Loewy (1893–1986), industrial designer
 Raymond McCreesh, Irish republican hunger striker who died in 1981
 Raymond Murray (1913–2004), US Marine Corps officer
 Raymond Washington (1953–1979), founder of the Crips street gang
 Raymond Williams (1921–1988), Welsh academic, novelist and critic

Fictional characters 
 Raymond Barone, main character in the television sitcom Everybody Loves Raymond
 Raymond Cocteau, mayor/governor/dictator of San Angeles in the 1990s movie Demolition Man
 Raymond Doyle, in the British TV series The Professionals
 Raymond Reddington, main character in the English TV series The Blacklist
 Raymond Shaw, main character in the novel The Manchurian Candidate played on film in 1962 by Laurence Harvey and 2004 by Liev Schreiber
 Raymond Stantz, main character in the film Ghostbusters
 Raymond, a cat villager in Animal Crossing: New Horizons

Surname 

 Alex Raymond (1909–1956), American comic strip artist
 Alfred John Raymond (1856–1935), mayor of Brisbane
 Allen Raymond, American political consultant
 Antonin Raymond (1888–1976), Czech architect
 Arthur Bugs Raymond (1882–1912), American Major League Baseball pitcher
 Edward Burleson Raymond (1848–1914), American rancher, politician, banker and founder of Raymondville, Texas
 Edwin A. Raymond (1861–1918), Wisconsin state legislator
 Eleanor Raymond (1887–1989), American architect
 Eric S. Raymond (born 1957), American software developer
 Eugene Raymond (born 1923), South African Army major-general, Surgeon-General and physician
 Gary Raymond (born 1935), British actor
 George Raymond (1914-1999), civil rights activist from Pennsylvania
 George Raymond Jr. (1943-1973), civil rights activist from Mississippi
 George Lansing Raymond (1839-1929), professor of aesthetic criticism
 Harold Tubby Raymond (1926–2017), American college football and baseball coach and player
 Harry Raymond (footballer), English footballer from 1908 to 1924
 Henry Jarvis Raymond (1820–1869), American journalist and politician; founder of The New York Times
 Jade Raymond (born 1974), Canadian video game producer and television personality
 Janice Raymond (model) (born 1951), Playboy Playmate of the Month for December 1974
 Jim Raymond (1917–1981), American comic strip artist
 Jonathan Raymond, American writer
 Lee Raymond (born 1938), American businessman, CEO and chairman of Exxon Mobil (1999–2005)
 Lisa Raymond (born 1973), American retired tennis player
 Lucas Raymond (born 2002), Swedish ice hockey player
 Mason Raymond (born 1985), Canadian former National Hockey League player
 Nathaniel Raymond (born 1977), American human rights investigator and anti-torture advocate
 Oliver Raymond (c.1605–1679), English MP
 Paul Raymond (publisher) (1925–2008), English pornographer
 Richard Raymond (pianist) (born 1965), Canadian pianist
 Richard Raymond (Texas politician) (born 1960)
 Rosanna Raymond (born 1967), New Zealand artist, poet, and cultural commentator
 Ruth Raymond (1897–1986), English artist
 Sophia Burrell née Raymond (1753–1802), English poet and dramatist
 Thomas Lynch Raymond (1875–1928), twice mayor of Newark, New Jersey
 Tito Raymond (born 1969), American bodybuilder
 Usher (musician) (born 1978), American musician Usher Raymond IV

Fictional characters
 Leon Raymond, a protagonist from  
 Ronnie Raymond, the first Firestorm from DC Comics

See also 
Ray (disambiguation)
Raimond

References 

English-language surnames
French-language surnames
English masculine given names
French masculine given names
Surnames